Axien is a village and a former municipality in the Wittenberg district in Saxony-Anhalt, Germany. Since 1 January 2011, it is part of the town Annaburg.

Geography and transport
The community lies about 35 km southeast of Wittenberg and about 20 km north of Torgau in the lowlands on the east bank of the Elbe on an old, now dry, arm of that river. West of the community runs Federal Highway (Bundesstraße) B 182, and to the north is the B 187. It lies on the "Mid-Germany Church Road". In the south, the community borders on Saxony.

History
The village of Axien is first documented in the 10th century. The village, however, must have been older, a castle by the name of Wazgrini in Axien having been mentioned in 865. It was used as a fortified bridgehead at a ford on the Elbe.

Subdivisions
 Axien
 Kähnitzsch (since 10 January 1938)
 Gehmen

Sightseeing
 Well known is the brick church with ceiling paintings from the 12th century.
 Atonement Cross in Kähnitzsch

References

Former municipalities in Saxony-Anhalt
Annaburg